Richard John Michael (born November 15, 1938) is a former American football player. Michael played left tackle for the Ohio State Buckeyes under Woody Hayes.

See also
 List of American Football League players

References

1938 births
Living people
American football offensive tackles
Houston Oilers players
Ohio State Buckeyes football players
Players of American football from Ohio
American Football League All-Star players
American Football League All-League players
Sportspeople from Hamilton, Ohio
American Football League players